Bryant is an unincorporated community in Benson Rural Municipality No. 35, Saskatchewan, Canada. Bryant gets its name from Quaker poet, journalist, and editor William Cullen Bryant.

See also 
 List of communities in Saskatchewan

References 

Benson No. 35, Saskatchewan
Ghost towns in Saskatchewan
Unincorporated communities in Saskatchewan
Division No. 1, Saskatchewan